The Master of the Arboga altarpiece was an artist working in Lübeck between 1490 and 1525.

German Renaissance painters